Lisa Kay, is an English actress who has also worked in Australia.

Early life and education

Kay grew up in Levisham on the North York Moors and has three sisters, Samantha, Sara and Caroline.
Kay first trained as a dancer with Sandra Burnham and then at the Bush-Davies School.

Career

UK

Kay  performed professionally in many professional stage shows before retraining at the Bristol Old Vic as an actress with considerable distinction.
Kay made her debut in ITV1's Heartbeat in 2004 the episode entitled Wrecked. She played the character of Emma Bryden, a lonely single mother who forms a friendship with PC Phil Bellamy. She then became a cast regular from October 2006 until the series' end in September 2010, playing Nurse Carol Cassidy. 

She appeared as Eleanor Ross Heaney in the 2001 romantic comedy film Bridget Jones's Diary.

Australia

Kay appeared in the Australian soap Home and Away for two episodes on 28 February 2018 and 12 March 2018 as Professor Juliet Pickford. In mid-March 2018 she appeared in Neighbours as Rita Newland.

In 2021 she appeared in the award-winning  ABC iview comedy series All My Friends Are Racist, The five-part series was written by Kodie Bedford and directed by Bjorn Stewart, and also starred Leah Purcell, Davey Thompson, and Tuuli Narkle.

References

External links

Living people
English film actresses
English stage actresses
English television actresses
English voice actresses
People from Ryedale (district)
1971 births
Actresses from Yorkshire
People from Beverley
English expatriates in Australia